Sirgitti is a city in Bilha Tehsil in Bilaspur district of Chattisgarh State, India. It is located 3 KM towards South from District head quarters Bilaspur. 7 KM from Belha. 120 KM from State capital Raipur.

Sirgitti village is located in the UTC 5.30 time zone and it follows Indian standard time(IST). Sirgitti sun rise time varies 1 minutes from IST. The vehicle driving side in Sirgitti is left, all vehicles should take left side during driving. Sirgitti people are using its national currency which is Indian Rupee and its international currency code is INR. Sirgitti phones and mobiles can be accessed by adding the indian country dialing code +91 from abroad. Sirgitti people are following the dd/mm/yyyy date format in day-to-day life.

Sirgiti is a census town in Bilaspur district in the Indian state of Chhattisgarh.

Nagpura ( 2 KM ) , Bilaspur ( 3 KM ) , Basiya ( 3 KM ) , Tarbahar Chowk ( 3 KM ) , Vinoba Nagar ( 3 KM ) are the nearby Villages to Sirgitti. Sirgitti is surrounded by Belha Tehsil towards South , Masturi Tehsil towards East , Takhatpur Tehsil towards west , Pathariya Tehsil towards west .

Bilaspur , Bilaspur , Akaltara , Bhatapara are the near by Cities to Sirgitti.

Demographics of Sirgitti
Chhattisgarhi is the Local Language here.
Politics in Sirgitti
Bharatiya Janata Party , BJP , INC are the major political parties in this area.
Polling Stations /Booths near Sirgitti
1)Bainsbodh
2)Siltra
3)Sirgitti
4)Sirgitti
5)Sirgitti
HOW TO REACH Sirgitti
By Rail
Bilaspur Junction Rail Way Station  Rail Way Station , Dadhapara Rail Way Station are the very nearby railway stations to Sirgitti.

Pincodes near Sirgitti
495001 ( Bilaspur (Bilaspur-CGH) ) , 495009 ( Koni ) , 495663 ( Gopal Nagar )
Colleges near Sirgitti
Govt. Pataleshwar College Masturi
Address :
Institute Of Technology Guru Ghasidas University Bilaspur
Address : Institute Of Technology Guru Ghasidas University Koni Bilaspur Chhattisgarh
Governmet Iti Takhatpur
Address : Paddiya , Takhatpur
Niranjan Kesharwani Collage
Address : Kota Kotsagar Ke Pass
Governmet Jpm College Takhatpur
Address : Jmp College Takhatpur
Schools in Sirgitti
Ps To Ms Govt. Kirtinagaar
Address : sirgitti , bilha , bilaspur (chhattisgarh) , Chattisgarh . PIN- 495004 , Post - Torwa
Ps Ms Udbhav Publicschool,w-16
Address : sirgitti , bilha , bilaspur (chhattisgarh) , Chattisgarh . PIN- 495004 , Post - Torwa
Ps Ms,sardar Santosh Singh M.
Address : sirgitti , bilha , bilaspur (chhattisgarh) , Chattisgarh . PIN- 495004 , Post - Torwa
Amar Jyoti Ps. Naya Para
Address : sirgitti , bilha , bilaspur (chhattisgarh) , Chattisgarh . PIN- 495004 , Post - Torwa
Ps Ms Anubhav Vidya M., Sirgit
Address : sirgitti , bilha , bilaspur (chhattisgarh) , Chattisgarh . PIN- 495004 , Post - Torwa

Govt Health Centers near Sirgitti

Demographics
 India census, Sirgiti had a population of 12,469. Males constitute 52% of the population and females 48%. Sirgiti has an average literacy rate of 64%, higher than the national average of 59.5%: male literacy is 75%, and female literacy is 52%. In Sirgiti, 15% of the population is under 6 years of age.

References

Cities and towns in Bilaspur district, Chhattisgarh